Gia Lâm may refer to:

 Gia Lâm District, Hanoi, Vietnam
 Gia Lam Airport
 Gia Lâm station
 Gia Lam Train Company, a Vietnamese railcar manufacturer